The 2015 Six Nations Championship, known as the 2015 RBS 6 Nations because of the tournament's sponsorship by the Royal Bank of Scotland, was the 16th series of the Six Nations Championship, the annual rugby union tournament. It was contested by England, France, Ireland, Italy, Scotland and Wales. Including the competition's previous incarnations as the Home Nations Championship and Five Nations Championship, it was the 121st edition of the tournament.

Ireland retained their title from the previous year, their 13th triumph in the competition. This was the first time that Ireland had retained their title outright since 1949, having shared the 1983 championship with France after winning in 1982. They were the first team to be awarded the redesigned Six Nations trophy introduced for 2015, which featured six sides as opposed to five.

Participants

* Parisse did not play in Italy's final match at home against Wales after an injury sustained in their round four match against France. Leonardo Ghiraldini took his place as captain.

Squads

Table

Fixtures
The 2015 Six Nations Championship commenced with a Friday night fixture, once again held at the Millennium Stadium in Cardiff, this time between Wales and England.

Round 1

Notes:
 Welsh captain Sam Warburton earned his 50th cap for Wales.

Notes:
 Marco Barbini made his international debut for Italy.
 Seán O'Brien was set to return to the Irish line-up after injury, but was replaced by Tommy O'Donnell in the starting XV following injury in the pre-game warm-up.

Notes:
 Loann Goujon made his international debut for France.
 Sam Hidalgo-Clyne made his international debut for Scotland.

Round 2

Notes:
 Giulio Bisegni made his international debut for Italy.
 Nick Easter, aged 36, became the oldest English player to score a try in a test match.

Round 3

Notes:
 Enrico Bacchin and Michele Visentin made their international debuts for Italy.
 Ben Toolis and Hamish Watson made their international debuts for Scotland.
 Italy got its first Six Nations win since beating Ireland 22–15 in 2013, and its second away win since beating Scotland 37–17 in 2007.

Notes:
 Brice Dulin's try was France's first try against Wales since their 2011 Six Nations fixture.
 Wales captain Sam Warburton equalled Ryan Jones' record of 33 Tests as captain.
 George North became the youngest player to earn 50 international caps (47 for Wales, 3 for the British and Irish Lions) at the age of 22, surpassing Australia's Joe Roff, who was 24.

Notes:
 Nick Easter earned his 50th cap for England.
 Ireland reclaim the Millennium Trophy for the first time since 2011.

Round 4

Notes:
 With this Welsh win, no team could win the Grand Slam or the Triple Crown.
 Rob Evans made his international debut for Wales.
 Wales captain Sam Warburton captained his country for a record 34th time, surpassing Ryan Jones' record of 33 Tests as captain.
 Paul O'Connell became the fourth player to earn 100 test caps for Ireland.
 Johnny Sexton and Cian Healy earned their 50th caps for Ireland.

Notes:
 England retained the Calcutta Cup.
 With this win, and Wales' win against Ireland, Australia dropped to sixth in the World Rugby Rankings, their lowest ever position.

Notes:
 Sergio Parisse won his 112th cap for Italy, a new national record.
 Noa Nakaitaci made his international debut for France.
 This was the first time that Italy failed to score any points in the Six Nations since their 25–0 loss to France in 2004.

Round 5

Notes:
 Wales' 41-point margin of victory was their biggest winning margin over Italy, surpassing the previous record of 39 they set in  1999.

Notes:
 Euan Murray earned his 66th test cap to become Scotland's most-capped prop, surpassing Allan Jacobsen's previous record of 65.
Ireland required a win of at least 21 points in order to remain capable of winning the championship.
 Ireland retain the Centenary Quaich.	
 With this loss, Scotland are effectively whitewashed, and finish at the bottom of the table for the fourth time in the Six Nations era, and the first time since 2012, and are awarded the wooden spoon as a result.

Notes:
 Dan Cole earned his 50th cap for England.
 This is the greatest number of points England has ever scored against France.
England had to win this game by 26 points or more to claim the Championship. They only won by 20, meaning that Ireland won the Championship instead.

Statistics

Points scorers

Try scorers

Broadcasting
In the United Kingdom, BBC One televised all the matches live, although for viewers in Scotland the week 4 match between Italy and France was shown on BBC Two Scotland. BBC Two also televised live the buildup of the opening match between Wales and England and after the match, an extra between the two sides on BBC Two but only for viewers in Wales. There was also a special Six Nations special looking ahead to the final week match on BBC Two but only for viewers in Northern Ireland. On the morning of the final week of matches, BBC Two televised classic Five Nations matches including Scotland vs Ireland in 1991 and France vs England in 1992. The final match of the tournament between England and France was watched live on BBC One by 9.63 million people, beating the previous record for that fixture of 9.56 million, set in 2011. This followed audiences of 4.1 million for the match between Italy and Wales and 5.1 million for the match between Scotland and Ireland earlier in the day. The BBC website also received 8.22 million unique browser hits during the day, breaking the previous record of 8.03 million set during the 2012 Summer Olympics in London. S4C simulcasted Wales matches in the Welsh language.

Notes

References

External links
Official site

 
2015 rugby union tournaments for national teams
2015
2014–15 in European rugby union
2014–15 in Irish rugby union
2014–15 in English rugby union
2014–15 in Welsh rugby union
2014–15 in Scottish rugby union
2014–15 in French rugby union
2014–15 in Italian rugby union
February 2015 sports events in Europe
March 2015 sports events in Europe
Royal Bank of Scotland